Hedong Subdistrict is a subdistrict of Taocheng District, in the eastern part of Hengshui, Hebei, People's Republic of China. , it has 14 residential communities and 14 villages under its administration.

See also
List of township-level divisions of Hebei

References

Township-level divisions of Hebei
Hengshui